Gusto, El Gusto or GUSTO may refer to:

Arts and entertainment
 Gusto!, an album by the American punk rock group Guttermouth
 Gusto (producer), an American house music DJ/producer
 El Gusto, a 2012 Franco-Irish-Algerian documentary film
 Gusto, a gangster in the American comedy film CB4
 Augustus "Gusto" Gummi, a character in the animated TV series Adventures of the Gummi Bears
 Gusto TV, original name of CTV Life Channel, a Canadian TV channel
 Gusto (TV program), a Russian culinary entertainment program that has aired since 1993
 Gusto Records, an American record label
 Gusto Records (UK label), an imprint of defunct British record label Gut Records

Other uses
 Gusto (company), a payroll and healthcare software provider
 Gusto Shipyard, Schiedam, Netherlands, closed in 1978
 Malo Gusto (born 2003), French footballer
 GUSTO (telescope) ( (Galactic / Extragalactic ULDB Spectroscopic Terahertz Observatory), a planned high-altitude balloon mission that will carry aloft an infrared telescope
 Project Gusto, a committee formed in 1957 to consider replacement candidates for the U2 reconnaissance airplane

See also
 Gusta (disambiguation)
 Auguste Gusteau, a character in the Pixar animated film Ratatouille